Macroplax is a genus of true bugs belonging to the family Oxycarenidae.

The species of this genus are found in Europe.

Species:
 Macroplax blancae Hoberlandt, 1943 
 Macroplax capensis Slater, 1972

References

Oxycarenidae
Hemiptera genera